The Lackawanna River is a  long river flowing into the Susquehanna River with 65 named tributaries, of which 33 are direct tributaries. The river flows through Susquehanna, Lackawanna, and Luzerne Counties in Pennsylvania. The tributaries include 40 creeks, 14 brooks, 9 runs, and 2 rivers. By length, the five largest tributaries are Roaring Brook, Spring Brook, the East Branch Lackawanna River, Stafford Meadow Brook, and the West Branch Lackawanna River. By watershed area, the five largest tributaries are Spring Brook, Roaring Brook, the East Branch Lackawanna River, Leggetts Creek, and the West Branch Lackawanna River.

Of the 37 tributaries of the Lackawanna River that have their own Chapter 93.9 designations, most are designated as Coldwater Fisheries. However, two tributaries (Eddy Creek and part of Stafford Meadow Brook) are designated as Warmwater Fisheries instead. An additional two tributaries (Summit Lake Creek and part of Leggetts Creek) are designated as Trout-Stocked Fisheries. Parts of six are designated as High-Quality Coldwater Fisheries: the East Branch Lackawanna River, the West Branch Lackawanna River, and parts of Grassy Island Creek, Roaring Brook, Stafford Meadow Brook, and Spring Brook. One tributary, Clarks Creek, holds an Exceptional Value designation. Wild trout naturally reproduce in approximately 30 of the tributaries.

Many tributaries of the Lackawanna River are environmentally degraded. At least 16 tributaries experience some degree of flow loss and at least 11 of those experience total flow loss. At least five tributaries, including Red Spring Run; Meadow Brook; Eddy Creek; Callender Gap Creek; and Coal Brook, have had reaches partially or totally destroyed by mining or by post-mining development. Extensive deposits of culm and silts from mining operations occur in the watersheds of at least seven tributaries, including Saint Johns Creek, Mill Creek, Keyser Creek, Eddy Creek, Sterry Creek, Grassy Island Creek, and Coal Brook.

The watersheds of at least 16 tributaries of the Lackawanna River contain waterfalls or morphologic sites such as water gaps and escarpments. The watershed of the tributary Roaring Brook contains seven such sites, though two are in the sub-watersheds of Rock Bottom Creek and Little Roaring Brook. There are also dozens of named ponds and lakesboth natural and manmade in the watersheds of more than 15 of the tributaries. Bogs and wetland complexes occur in the watersheds of about 12 tributaries.

Tributaries of the Lackawanna River

Tributaries of the main stem

Tributaries of Mill Creek

Tributaries of Spring Brook

Tributaries of Keyser Creek

Tributaries of Roaring Brook

Tributaries of Leggetts Creek

Other tributaries

See also
List of rivers of Pennsylvania

Notes

References

Lackawanna River

Lackawanna